Miss USSR was a national beauty contest held in the Soviet Union. It ran for three years from 1989 through to the dissolution of the Union in 1991.

Titleholders

Representatives at International Beauty Pageants

Representatives at Miss Universe

Representatives at Miss World

Representatives at Miss International
'''

Representatives at Miss Charm International

References

Beauty pageants in Russia
Competitions in the Soviet Union
Recurring events established in 1989
Recurring events disestablished in 1991
1989 establishments in the Soviet Union
1991 disestablishments in the Soviet Union
Soviet awards